François-Louis Schmied (born November 8, 1873 in Geneva; died January 1941 in Tahanaout, Morocco), was a French painter, wood engraver, printer, editor, illustrator, and bookbinder of Swiss origin.

Of Swiss origin, François-Louis Schmied established himself in France, where he was later naturalized, and ultimately was exiled in Morocco around 1931 or 1932.  He is considered a major artist in the Art Deco style, particularly in the area of publishing for bibliophiles. He is the father of engraver Théo Schmied, who directed François-Louis Schmied's workshop beginning in 1924.

In 1910 Schmied was commissioned to engrave and print Paul Jouve's illustrations for The Jungle Book by Rudyard Kipling. This book was finally published in 1919 and brought Schmied considerable attention. The success of the production allowed Schmied to expand his operations, purchase a Stanhope handpress, and hire a group of craftsmen who helped Schmied execute some of his most famous and pioneering works such as Les Climats (1924), Daphne (1924), and Le Cantique des Cantiques (1925).

Schmied books were very expensive to produce and were always printed in a very limited edition, usually numbering no more than 100-200 copies. His marketing strategy was to display sheets of his work in progress at an annual Parisian art fair and seek out the subscription of wealthy bibliophiles and other interested organizations. During the "Roaring 20s" it was not difficult to find suitable patrons, but with the onset of The Great Depression, the economic climate could no longer support Schmied's expensive projects and eventually he was forced to sell off virtually all his assets and close down his shop.

See also 

School of Paris
Années folles
Art Deco

References

1873 births
1941 deaths
Death in Morocco
Bookbinders
French publishers (people)
Swiss emigrants to France